Ajit Chandila (born 5 December 1983) is a former Indian cricketer from Haryana. He played for Rajasthan Royals until 2013 but was previously known for his performance for the Air India North Zone team.

Indian Premier League career

His (IPL) career started in 2011 when Delhi Daredevils selected him in their probable team. He made his IPL debut on 23 April 2012 at Jaipur. It is known that he is mentored by Indian spinner Narendra Hirwani. Ajit became the first bowler in the IPL's fifth season to take a hat-trick. He is the seventh bowler to get a hat-trick in the history of the IPL.

Chandila got into controversy in IPL 6 when he ran-out Adam Gilchrist and appealed against him when Gilchrist was caught short of the crease while taking evasive action to a throw that hit him on the glove. Gilchrist termed it completely against the spirit of the game.

Spot fixing allegation and arrest

On 16 May 2013, he was arrested on charges of spot-fixing during IPL 6 by the Delhi police along with Sreesanth and Ankeet Chavan, who play alongside him for Rajasthan Royals.

After being arrested, he was immediately suspended by his employer, Air India. In January 2016, he was given a life ban from all forms of cricket by the BCCI.

References

External links

 First hat-trick of IPL Season Five 

1983 births
Living people
Indian cricketers
Haryana cricketers
Rajasthan Royals cricketers
Cricketers banned for corruption